Miss World Mongolia, Miss Mongolia are the national beauty contest for unmarried women of Mongolia which is held annually with breaks. The winner represents Mongolia at the Miss World competition. The alleged winner would participate in the international beauty pageant Miss World. .

Miss World Mongolia was held for first time in 2005. The pageant became the national franchise of Miss World in 2005–present, Miss Universe in 2018–present, and Miss International in 2001–present.

The current Miss World Mongolia is Enkhjin Tseveendash. She was crowned on 30 August 2017 in Holiday In Ulaanbaatar hotel and Conference Center.

Titleholders
Color key

Miss Earth Mongolia 
Mongolia debuted at the Miss Earth in 2005. Between 2005 and 2013 Miss Earth Mongolia had selected by another agency. Begun in 2014 the previous winner Miss World Mongolia may compete at the Miss Earth pageant.

Notes
In 2008: Sarnai Amar won the title of World Miss University 2008 in Korea.
In 2010 :Battsetseg Turbat top 10 the title of Asian Super Model 2010
In 2015: Battsetseg Turbat top 10 the title of Miss Tourism Queen Of The Year International 2015 in Germany 
In 2015: Bayartsetseg Altangerel top 16 the title of Miss Earth 2015 in Austria
In 2016: Anu Namshir won the title of Miss Tourism Queen International 2016 in China

Gallery

Miss World Mongolia winners

See also 
 Miss Mongolia

References

External links 
Official page
Miss World Official website

Beauty pageants in Mongolia
Mongolian awards